Ernst Friedrich Germar  (3 November 1786 – 8 July 1853) was a German professor and director of the Mineralogical Museum at Halle. As well as being a mineralogist he was interested in entomology and particularly in the Coleoptera and Hemiptera. He monographed the heteropteran family Scutelleridae.

In 1845, he was elected a foreign member of the Royal Swedish Academy of Sciences.

Published works 
Amongst Germar's publications are:
Species Cicadarium enumeratae et sub genera distributae. Thon's Entomologisches Archiv. (2)2: 37–57, pl. 1 (1830).
Observations sur plusieurs espèces du genre Cicada, Latr. Rev. Entomol. Silbermann 2: 49–82, pls. 19-26 (1834).
Ueber die Elateriden mit häutigen Anhängen der Tarsenglieder. Z. Entomol. (Germar) 1: 193-236 (1839) (1839).
Bemerkungen über Elateriden. Z. Entomol. (Breslau) 5: 133-192 (1844).
Beiträge zur insektenfauna von Adelaide. Linn. Entomol. 3: 153-247  (1848).
Fauna Insectorum Europae. There were 24 fascicles in this work; August Ahrens producing the first two, Germar and Georg Friedrich Kaulfuss the third (1817) and Germar alone the remaining 21.
He was also editor of the entomological journal Zeitschrift für die Entomologie, which was published from 1839 to 1844.

Collections
Non Coleoptera Deutsches Entomologisches Institut (DEI)

References
Brockhaus and Efron Encyclopedic Dictionary
 Groll, E. K. (Hrsg.): Biografien der Entomologen der Welt : Datenbank. Version 4.15 : Senckenberg Deutsches Entomologisches Institut, 2010 
 Gaedike, R.; Groll, E. K. & Taeger, A. 2012: Bibliography of the entomological literature from the beginning until 1863 : online database - version 1.0 - Senckenberg Deutsches Entomologisches Institut. Full list of Germar's publications.

1786 births
1853 deaths
German entomologists
German mineralogists
People from the Electorate of Saxony
Leipzig University alumni
University of Halle alumni
Academic staff of the Martin Luther University of Halle-Wittenberg
Members of the Royal Swedish Academy of Sciences